Kayser Jan Gouka Airstrip  is near the Kayser Mountains range in Sipaliwini District, Suriname. It was constructed as part of Operation Grasshopper ( a project to look for natural resources) and has one long grass runway. Fishing and wildlife tours are prime users of the airstrip.

History 
The runway was laid out in the framework of Operation Grasshopper and is located on the Zuid River (branch of the Lucie River) near the Kayser Mountain range, named after the explorer Mr. C.C. Käyser. In July 1959 under the direction of Dirk Geijskes an expedition began in preparation for the airports at the Coeroeni River and the Kayser Mountains. In December 1960, Kayser Airstrip opened up for public air traffic in Suriname. On 25 October 1968 a KLM Aerocarto C-47A registered PH-DAA flew into Tafelberg Mountain, Suriname, following an engine failure while on a survey flight. The aircraft collided with the mountain in cloudy conditions, killing three of the five people on board. In memory of the deceased Captain Jan Gouka, the Kayser Airstrip was named after him.

Airlines and destinations
Currently, no scheduled airlines are offered from Kayser Jan Gouka Airstrip.

Charter 
Charter Airlines serving this airport are:

See also

 List of airports in Suriname
 Transport in Suriname

References

External links
OurAirports - Kayser
OpenStreetMap - Kayser
Fishing tours
Kayak expedition

Airports in Suriname
Sipaliwini District